Chandelier neurons or chandelier cells are a subset of GABAergic cortical interneurons. They are described as parvalbumin-containing and fast-spiking to distinguish them from other subtypes of GABAergic neurons, although more recent work has suggested that only a subset of chandelier cells test positive for parvalbumin by immunostaining. The name comes from the specific shape of their axon arbors, with the terminals forming distinct arrays called "cartridges".  The cartridges are immunoreactive to an isoform of the GABA membrane transporter, GAT-1, and this serves as their identifying feature. GAT-1 is involved in the process of GABA reuptake into nerve terminals, thus helping to terminate its synaptic activity. Chandelier neurons synapse exclusively to the axon initial segment of pyramidal neurons, near the site where action potential is generated. It is believed that they provide inhibitory input to the pyramidal neurons, but there is data showing that in some circumstances the GABA from chandelier neurons could be excitatory. 

The axon cartridges formed by chandelier cells are one of the synapse types that show the most dramatic changes during normal adolescence, and could potentially be relevant to the adult onset of psychiatric disease. Furthering this link, in schizophrenia, scientists have observed changes in their form and functionality, such as 40% decrease in the axon terminal density.

References

External links 

 SRF interviews David Lewis - an interview touching on the GABAergic neuronal dysfunction in schizophrenia and the role of the chandelier cells.
 NIF Search - Chandelier Cell via the Neuroscience Information Framework
 Cortical Development - images of chandelier neurons and information on their developmental changes. Translational Neuroscience Program at the University of Pittsburgh.
 How chandelier cells light up human thought - A type of brain cell called a chandelier neuron might be what gives us the edge over other mammals in thought and language, New Scientist, 3 September 2008

Central nervous system neurons
Neurons